The Cornell HR Review (CHRR) was an online journal of human resource management articles published independently by graduate students at Cornell University. The publication ran from 2009 to 2019.

History

The Cornell HR Review published its first article on December 21, 2009, and was the oldest operating student-edited human resources publication in the United States. It was founded by Cornell graduate student Jonathan E. DeGraff, with the financial support of Harry C. Katz, dean of the Cornell University School of Industrial and Labor Relations.

CHRR is digitally archived by Cornell's Martin P. Catherwood Library and is indexed by Princeton University Library and the National Library of Australia. Its articles have been cited by academic, practitioner, and popular news media outlets, including the Houston Chronicle, HowStuffWorks, and the Society for Human Resource Management.

See also
Industrial and Labor Relations Review

References

External links
Archive of CHRR articles at Cornell's Catherwood Library
Internet Archive of CHRR Website
CHRR listing at Human Resource Executive

Cornell University academic journals
Publications established in 2009
English-language journals
Academic journals edited by students
Human resource management publications
2009 establishments in New York (state)